Xylocopa aestuans, or Xylocopa (Koptortosoma) aestuans, is a species of carpenter bee. It is widely distributed in Southeast Asia.

It is a large bee, measuring more than 20mm in length. Historically, Xylocopa pubescens has sometimes been treated as a subspecies of aestuans. The two taxa have different distributions, with X. aestuans restricted to Southeast Asia, while X. pubescens occurs throughout most of Africa and eastward as far as the entire region of South Asia. There are also very clear, but subtle differences in the morphology of females and males.

References

Further reading 
 Ruggiero M. (project leader), Ascher J. et al. (2013). ITIS Bees: World Bee Checklist (version Sep 2009). In: Species 2000 & ITIS Catalogue of Life, 11 March 2013 (Roskov Y., Kunze T., Paglinawan L., Orrell T., Nicolson D., Culham A., Bailly N., Kirk P., Bourgoin T., Baillargeon G., Hernandez F., De Wever A., eds). Digital resource at www.catalogueoflife.org/col/. Species 2000: Reading, UK.
 Engel MS, Alqarni AS, Shebl MA, Iqbal J. & Hinojosa-Diaz IA. 2017. A new species of the carpenter bee genus Xylocopa from the Sarawat Mountains in southwestern Saudi Arabia (Hymenoptera, Apidae). Zookeys, 716: 29–41.

External links 
 http://www.atlashymenoptera.net/pagetaxon.asp?tx_id=4956

aestuans
Hymenoptera of Asia
Fauna of Southeast Asia
Insects of China
Insects of India
Insects of Laos
Insects of Malaysia
Insects of Thailand
Insects of Vietnam
Insects of Bangladesh
Insects of Myanmar
Insects of Cambodia
Insects of Singapore
Insects described in 1758
Taxa named by Carl Linnaeus